Hollym may refer to:

Hollym (publishing house)
Hollym, East Riding of Yorkshire, England